Ochyrotica yanoi is a moth of the family Pterophoridae. It is known from New Guinea, China (Hainan and Hong Kong), Taiwan, Vietnam and the Ryukyu Islands, the Philippines and India.

References

Moths described in 1988
Ochyroticinae
Moths of Asia
Moths of Japan